Wajee Nature Park is a bird conservancy and nature park in Mukuruwe-ini, central Kenya. It is home to two rare species: the Hinde's babbler and the side-striped jackal.

See also
 Baden-Powell grave
 Jeevanjee Gardens

External links

References

Parks in Kenya
Central Province (Kenya)
Bird parks